Kelley Steadman (born July 17, 1990) is an American retired ice hockey player, currently serving as an ice hockey development ambassador for Lightning Made, the community hockey department of the Tampa Bay Lightning. As a member of the United States' women's national team, she won two IIHF World Women's Championship gold medals, in 2011 and 2013. She played with the Boston Blades of the Canadian Women's Hockey League (CWHL), Tornado Dmitrov of the Russian Women's Hockey League (RWHL; replaced by ZhHL in 2015), and the Buffalo Beauts of the National Women's Hockey League (NWHL; renamed PHF in 2021).

Playing career
Steadman attended secondary school at Northwood School in Lake Placid, New York. Steadman was a four-sport athlete at Northwood, participating in ice hockey, soccer, lacrosse, and crew. The ice hockey team also featured her future Team USA U18 teammate Blake Bolden. As a senior on the ice hockey team, she served as an alternate captain and registered 34 points (19 goals + 15 assists).

NCAA
Steadman played the entirety of her college ice hockey career, 2008–2012, with the Mercyhurst Lakers women's ice hockey program. In the 2008–09, her freshman season with the Lakers, Steadman appeared in all 37 games and tallied 22 points (13+9), finishing the season with a +14 plus/minus rating. She scored her first collegiate goal on October 11, 2008, against the Boston University Terriers. During her rookie campaign she posted two two-goal games, first on November 1 in a 4–3 overtime win against Colgate and, three weeks later, on November 22, against the Brown Bears. In her first three postseason games, she scored one goal in each match, including in the 2009 CHA Tournament Final versus Wayne State (March 7) where she contributed two points (1+1) to the Lakers’ CHL Championship victory. On March 14, Steadman scored the Lakers’ first goal in the 2009 NCAA Tournament, in the quarterfinal game versus No. 7 St. Lawrence.

In 2009–10, her sophomore season, she appeared in all 36 games with the Lakers and scored 28 points (15+13), ranking sixth on the team in scoring. In the first game of the regular season (October 2), Steadman scored a goal as the Lakers trounced Bemidji State, 4–1. In a two-game sweep of Rensselaer (October 16–17), Steadman scored in back to back games, including the game-winning goal in the first contest.  On November 7, her two goals against Wayne State marked the beginning of a season-high six-game point streak. Steadman had a season-high four points with a hat trick and an assist in an 8–0 win over Wayne State on February 19, 2010.  Of her fifteen goals, three were scored on the power play and two were short-handed. Her five game-winning goals tied for second on the team.

The 2010–11 season saw Steadman continue to build on her solid sophomore performance. She appeared in 33 games, scoring 17 goals and earning 29 points, career-highs to that point. Steadman started the season on a five-game point streak, with a highlight two-goal game at Maine on October 10. She had a second two-goal game on December 4 against the Niagara Purple Eagles, adding to an eventual 7–2 victory. In the 2011 CHA Playoff Tournament, she scored a goal in the semifinals against Robert Morris, helping the Lakers claim a 3–1 victory and progress to the finals, in which they beat the Syracuse Orange and claimed the second conference championship since Steadman joined the program. Steadman rounded out the season with a selection to the United States women's national ice hockey team for the 2011 IIHF Women's World Championship in April 2011.

In the October 29, 2011 match versus Lindenwood, Steadman scored four goals and notched an assist, as the Lakers defeated the Lions by a 14–0 mark.

As of 2018, several of Steadman's senior campaign (2011–12) totals remained in the Lakers’ individual season top-ten record book. She sits at fifth for goals in a season, with 33, and goals per game, at 0.97, tied at sixth with Bailey Bram for power-play goals in a season, with 12, and four-way tied at sixth for short-handed goals in a season, with 4. A number of her career scoring totals as a Laker are also top-ten, including her 7 career short-handed goals, which place her at fifth in program history, 78 all-time career goals and 0.56 goals per game over 140 games, which both place at sixth, and 19 power play goals, which ties with Jenna Dingeldin for ninth. She is also tied at ninth with Cassea Schols for both most career penalties drawn, with 81, and most penalty minutes, with 162.

NWHL
Steadman played with the Buffalo Beauts of the NWHL for the 2015–16 and 2016–17 seasons, originally signing as a practice player because her full-time job as Director of Hockey Operations with the Robert Morris Colonials significantly limited her ability to travel with the team. Ultimately able to play in just 18 regular season games during her time with the Beauts, her performance earned her the first NWHL contract offered to a practice player, a one-year commitment worth $15,000 which she signed for the 2016–17 season. Despite her low game count, Steadman made it into the record books more than once and was a fan favorite. She scored the first regular season goal in Buffalo Beauts franchise history on the league's opening day, October 11, 2015, slipping one past Boston Pride goaltender Brittany Ott.

Steadman was named the NWHL Player of the Week for the weeks of November 22, 2015 and January 31, 2016. Selected to the 1st NWHL All-Star Game, she won shooting accuracy, scored the first All-Star Game goal in NWHL history, and was named MVP of the 1st NWHL All-Star Game, scoring two goals and helping her team to a 9–1 victory. Her sweater from the game is displayed at the Hockey Hall of Fame. Steadman was named one of the two captains for the 2nd NWHL All-Star Game.

International play

Steadman played with Team USA under-18 squad at the 2008 IIHF World Women's U18 Championship. She joined a roster filled with other future hockey stars, including Megan Bozek, Kendall Coyne Schofield, Brianna Decker, Amanda Kessel, Madison Packer, and her high school teammate, Blake Bolden. Steadman played in all five games and notched five assists, ending the tournament with a +10 rating. Team USA won the final against Team Canada to complete a sweep of the tournament and claim the gold medal.

On January 28, 2011, it was announced that Steadman was named to the preliminary roster for the U.S. women's national team and she was one of 30 players who took part in a Team USA selection/training camp during April 4–12, 2011. She was named to the final roster that participated at the 2011 IIHF Women's World Championship, the first player from Mercyhurst College to be selected to the US Women's National Team.

Personal life 
Born on July 17, 1990, in Plattsburgh, New York, she is the third and youngest child of Robert and Nancy Steadman.

She holds a bachelor's degree in elementary education from Mercyhurst University and a master's degree in instructional leadership from Robert Morris University.

Steadman met and started dating Sara Wemlinger, a physician, during her time coaching at Mercyhurst. The two married on Florida's Anna Maria Island in April 2021.

Career statistics

Regular season and playoffs 

Sources: USCHO, Elite Prospects

International

Awards and achievements

Notes

References

External links
 
 

Living people
1990 births
American expatriate ice hockey players in Russia
American ice hockey coaches
American women's ice hockey forwards
Boston Blades players
Buffalo Beauts players
Clarkson Cup champions
Ice hockey players from New York (state)
LGBT ice hockey players
American LGBT sportspeople
Mercyhurst Lakers women's ice hockey coaches
Mercyhurst Lakers women's ice hockey players
People from Plattsburgh, New York
HC Tornado players